Statistics of the V-League in the 1996 season.

Standings

Championship final
Dong Thap    3-1 HCMC Police

References
1996 V-League at RSSSF

Vietnamese Super League seasons
Viet
Viet
1